Aristolochia sipho is an ornamental plant in the family Aristolochiaceae.

References
 

sipho